United Automobile Services was a bus company, which operated local and regional bus services in County Durham, Cumbria, Northumberland, North Yorkshire and Tyne and Wear, England. It provided bus services across a wide geographical area, stretching from the border town of Berwick-upon-Tweed in the north, Filey in the south, and Carlisle in the west.

History

The company was founded in Lowestoft, Suffolk in May 1912, with two routes. One route operated in Suffolk, with the other operating over 200 miles away in County Durham, between Bishop Auckland and Durham.

During the 1920s, the company expanded in Lincolnshire and Norfolk, as well as County Durham, Northumberland and North Yorkshire.

In 1929, control passed to the Tilling Group and the London and North Eastern Railway, and in 1931 the new owners split off the East Anglian operations into a separate company, Eastern Counties Omnibus Company.

United also started East Midland Motor Services. This came about through the desire to expand. One of their managers, W.T. Underwood, was sent to Clowne (near Chesterfield) to set up a bus company in his own name. The Underwoods company later became East Midland.

United was nationalised in 1948, and controlled first by the British Transport Commission, from 1 January 1963 by the Transport Holding Company, and from 1 January 1969 by the National Bus Company.

The company ran vehicles from its head office in Darlington and garages across their area, including Durham, Hartlepool, Whitby and Peterlee amongst others. Most of those vehicles were Bristols with Gardner engines and Eastern Coach Works bodies, the LH and VR being common vehicles. Another vehicle commonly used was the Leyland National. United were one of only three operators (and the only English operator) to buy the Bristol REMH  coach chassis. These 35 vehicles, which had Plaxton Panorama Elite III 49-seat coach bodywork, were delivered between 1971 and 1975.

In the mid-1980s, following the deregulation of bus services, a number of Dodge and Mercedes-Benz minibuses were purchased by United for use on local services.

Most of these minibuses were branded with names such as Roadranger (Darlington), Hoppa (Hartlepool), Panther (Peterlee) and Clipper (Whitby), amongst others. These new minibus routes ran around housing estates to a Hail and Ride system and after some initial controversy, these services proved successful for United, most notably in Darlington where the minibus network was hugely expanded.

In the lead up to privatisation, the Northumberland and Scarborough areas were separated into two new companies, Northumbria Motor Services and Scarborough & District in 1986, with the latter then being transferred to East Yorkshire Motor Services.

On 2 December 1987, as part of the privatisation of the National Bus Company, United was sold to Caldaire Holdings who had earlier purchased West Riding Automobile Company.

In 1990, operations in Cleveland and Middlesbrough were separated and renamed Tees & District, with the Stockton-on-Tees depot operating under the Teesside Motor Services brand.

In 1992, United was sold to the Westcourt Group. It was sold in 1995 to National Express, and again in 1996 to the Cowie Group. Today it is part of Arriva North East.

Former operating areas 
In the 1985 official fleet book, United's operations were shown as split into three operating areas; Northumberland, Durham, and Cleveland.

Northumberland

Depots and outstations 
 Allenheads (Outstation) - The Barn
 Alnwick - Lisburn Street
 Ashington - Lintonville Terrace
 Berwick - Marygate
 Blyth - Bridge Street
 Hexham - Burn Lane
 Morpeth - Dark Lane
 Newcastle (Gallowgate) - Gallowgate
 Newcastle (Jesmond) - Portland Terrace
 Rothbury - High Street
 Seahouses (Outstation) - Public Car Park
 Whitley Bay - Park Avenue
 Wooler - South Road

Durham

Depots and outstations 
 Barnard Castle (Outstation) - Thorngate
 Bishop Auckland - Morland Street
 Darlington - Bus Station, Feethams
 Durham - Waddington Street
 Hawes (Outstation) - Gayle Lane
 Newton Aycliffe (Outstation) – Ridgeway
 Northallerton - Brompton Road
 Peterlee - Davey Drive
 Richmond - Station Yard
 Ripon - Park Street
 Shotton Colliery - Flemming Field (1930s)
 Sunderland - Toward Road

Cleveland

Depots and outstations 
 Hartlepool - Clarence Road
 Loftus - Whitby Road
 Middlesbrough - Union Street
 Pickering (Outstation) - Thornton Road
 Redcar - Regent Street
 Scarborough - Vernon Road
 Stokesley - North Road
 Whitby - Upgang Lane

Cumbria 
Carlisle - Lowther Street- routes east of Carlisle towards Newcastle and Carlisle Town Hall to Botcherby estate

References

External links 

United Flickr gallery

Former bus operators in England
1912 establishments in England